King's Square or King Square may refer to the following places:

United Kingdom
 King Square, Barry, Wales
 King Square, Bridgwater, Somerset, England
 Kings Square, Gloucester, England
 King Square, London
King Square Gardens
 King's Square (York)

Elsewhere
 Kings Square, Fremantle, Australia
 Kings Square, Perth, Australia
 King's Square, St. George's, Bermuda
 King Square Shopping Mall, Markham, Ontario, Canada
 King’s Square, Saint John, New Brunswick, Canada
 King's Square, Benin City, Nigeria
 Königsplatz, Berlin, Germany, now Platz der Republik
 Königsplatz, Munich, Germany
Königsplatz (Munich U-Bahn)
 Plaça del Rei, Barcelona, Spain

See also 

 Royal Plaza (disambiguation)
 Queen Square (disambiguation)
 Königsplatz (disambiguation)